Julius James (born 9 July 1984) is a Trinidadian footballer.

Career

College
James played college soccer for the University of Connecticut, and was a 2007 Hermann Trophy candidate and Lowe's Senior CLASS Award finalist.

Professional
James drafted 9th overall in the 2008 MLS SuperDraft by Toronto FC, and played with them during their 2008 preseason, but suffered a shoulder injury against the New York Red Bulls and missed his side's first two matches of the 2008 regular season. He recovered to make the bench for Toronto's first win of the season against the Los Angeles Galaxy, and scored on his MLS debut, also against Galaxy.

James was traded to Houston Dynamo on 12 December 2008 as part of the deal that took Dwayne De Rosario to Toronto FC. On 14 August 2009, after a short loan period at Minnesota Thunder in the USL First Division, James was traded to D.C. United in exchange for a third-round pick in the 2012 MLS SuperDraft. On 11 September 2010 James scored his 2nd goal for DC in a 1–0 away win vs. his old team Toronto.

On 17 February 2011, D.C. United waived James.

On 28 February 2011, Columbus Crew announced that they had signed James. He made his debut on the next day as a second-half substitute in the second leg of the Crew's CONCACAF Champions League quarter-final series against Real Salt Lake. He played his first league game with the Crew on 19 March 2011 against his former team, D.C. United, in their 2011 MLS season opener.

James signed a multi-year contract extension with Columbus on 6 July 2011.

After the conclusion of the 2012 season, Columbus declined the 2013 option on James's contract and he entered the 2012 MLS Re-Entry Draft. James became a free agent after he went undrafted in both rounds of the draft.

James signed with Carolina RailHawks of the North American Soccer League (NASL) for the 2013 season. On 1 March 2014, James signed with San Antonio Scorpions of NASL. He re-signed with San Antonio on 9 January 2015.

Following the 2015 NASL season, the Scorpions suspended operations. On 27 January 2016, James signed with the Fort Lauderdale Strikers.

International
James played for the Trinidad and Tobago Under-17 Team that traveled to Brazil, Haiti, and the United States, and took part in the 2001 FIFA U-17 World Championship, where they suffered a 6–1 defeat to Brazil in the group stage. He earned his first senior cap for Trinidad and Tobago national football team against Guyana on 3 September 2008.

Personal
James was a resource economics major at the University of Connecticut. He now resides in Fort Lauderdale, FL and is an elite soccer coach for International Miami CF Academy. He is married with one child.

References

External links
 
 
 

1984 births
Living people
Trinidad and Tobago footballers
Trinidad and Tobago expatriate footballers
UConn Huskies men's soccer players
Westchester Flames players
Toronto FC players
Houston Dynamo FC players
Minnesota Thunder players
D.C. United players
Columbus Crew players
North Carolina FC players
San Antonio Scorpions players
Expatriate soccer players in Canada
Expatriate soccer players in the United States
Association football defenders
People from Tunapuna–Piarco
Trinidad and Tobago expatriate sportspeople in Canada
Trinidad and Tobago expatriate sportspeople in the United States
USL League Two players
Major League Soccer players
USL First Division players
North American Soccer League players
Toronto FC draft picks
Fort Lauderdale Strikers players
Sacramento Republic FC players
USL Championship players
All-American men's college soccer players
Trinidad and Tobago international footballers
National Premier Soccer League players